Rehab Ahmed (born 2 March 1991) is an Egyptian Paralympic powerlifter. She is a two-time silver medalist at the Summer Paralympics and a three-time gold medalist at the World Para Powerlifting Championships.

Career 

She represented Egypt at the 2016 Summer Paralympics held in Rio de Janeiro, Brazil and she won the silver medal in the women's 50 kg event. She also won the silver medal in the women's 50 kg event at the 2020 Summer Paralympics held in Tokyo, Japan. She also set a new Paralympic Record of 117 kg in her first lift which she then improved to 120 kg in her second lift.

She also won the gold medal in the women's 50 kg event at the 2017 World Championships held in Mexico City, Mexico, the 2019 World Championships held in Nur-Sultan, Kazakhstan and the 2021 World Championships held in Tbilisi, Georgia.

Results

References

External links 
 

Living people
1991 births
Place of birth missing (living people)
Egyptian powerlifters
Powerlifters at the 2016 Summer Paralympics
Powerlifters at the 2020 Summer Paralympics
Medalists at the 2016 Summer Paralympics
Medalists at the 2020 Summer Paralympics
Paralympic silver medalists for Egypt
Paralympic medalists in powerlifting
Paralympic powerlifters of Egypt
21st-century Egyptian women